Upper Vaitarana Dam, is an earthfill and gravity dam on west flowing Vaitarna river  near Igatpuri, Nashik district of Maharashtra state in India. The reservoir created by this dam spreads on both Vaitarna and Godavari rivers catchment area.

Specifications

Purpose
 Municipal water supply to Mumbai city and hydroelectricity (60 MW).

See also
 Vaitarna Dam
 Middle Vaitarna Dam
 Dams in Maharashtra
 List of reservoirs and dams in India

References

Dams in Nashik district
Dams completed in 1973
1973 establishments in Maharashtra